Vincenzo Marruocco (born 26 March 1979) is an Italian football goalkeeper currently playing for Cavese. He also played at Serie A level with Cagliari Calcio.

In January 2008 he was exchanged with Luca Capecchi. On 1 September 2008, his contract with Cagliari was terminated.

References

External links
Gazzetta dello Sport player profile 
 Profile at AIC.Football.it 

1979 births
Footballers from Naples
Living people
Italian footballers
Association football goalkeepers
S.S.C. Giugliano players
U.S. Lecce players
A.C.R. Messina players
U.S. Salernitana 1919 players
S.S. Chieti Calcio players
Calcio Foggia 1920 players
Cagliari Calcio players
Ravenna F.C. players
Cavese 1919 players
Manfredonia Calcio players
U.S. Avellino 1912 players
Paganese Calcio 1926 players
Serie A players
Serie B players
Serie C players
Serie D players
S.S. Ischia Isolaverde players